Naushahro Feroze railway station 
(Sindhi: نوشهروفيروز ريلوي اسٽيشن) is  located in Naushehro Feroz, Sindh,  Pakistan.

See also
 List of railway stations in Pakistan
 Pakistan Railways

References

External links

Railway stations in Naushahro Feroze District